Steve Barrows is a former American football player and coach. He most recently served as the head football coach at Kentucky Christian University from 2015 to 2016. He previously held the head coaching positions at Anderson University in Anderson, Indiana from 1999 to 2002 and on an interim basis at the University of Minnesota–Morris in 1995.

Head coaching record

Notes

References

Year of birth missing (living people)
Living people
Anderson Ravens football coaches
Bethany Swedes football coaches
Charleston Southern Buccaneers football coaches
Hardin–Simmons Cowboys football coaches
Kentucky Christian Knights football coaches
Minnesota Morris Cougars football coaches
McKendree Bearcats football coaches
Mount St. Joseph Lions football coaches
Ohio Bobcats football coaches
William Penn Statesmen football coaches
Ohio University alumni